A bucking bull is a bull used in American rodeo bull riding competition. They are usually a Brahma crossed with another breed, weighing 1,500 pounds or more, selected for their tendency to "leap, plunge and spin" when a human is on its back. Circa mid-20th century breeders began selecting bulls for bad temperament, that would buck when ridden.
Many of the best bucking bulls trace their lineage to bulls owned by Charlie Plummer of Oklahoma. These are known as Plummer bulls.

Bulls are viewed as athletes.  They usually are started in their bucking career at the age of two or three, reach their athletic prime at age five or six, and if they remain healthy, can continue bucking at least until the age of 10, sometimes longer.

In some competitions between bulls, with a purse amounting to tens of thousands of dollars per event, the bulls are ridden by electronic dummies, not rodeo bull riders. Good performing bulls attain a celebrity status and can be considered a star athlete in their own right, and a valiant competitor on the field against the human rider.

The first sale of breeding cows out of champion bucking bulls was in 1999.

The percent of top professional riders staying on the bull for a full eight second "out" had dropped from 75% in the early 1990s to 35% circa 2014. This has led to criticism that the breeding has resulted in excessively aggressive and dangerous animals.

Some notable bucking bulls include Bodacious, Sweet Pro's Bruiser, Bushwacker, Chicken on a Chain, Dillinger, Little Yellow Jacket and Skoal Pacific Bell. A bull named Panhandle Slim had four clones, with identical bucking patterns, who like their sire, competed in the Professional Bull Riders circuit.

See also
Mechanical bull
Stock contractor
Rodeo clown
Pickup rider
Steer riding

References

Bibliography

Sources

 
Bull sports
Bulls
Western (genre) staples and terminology